Elections to Liverpool Town Council were held on Monday 2 November 1846. One third of the council seats were up for election, the term of office of each councillor being three years.

Three of the sixteen wards were uncontested. In the uncontested elections, votes were still cast, although in very small numbers.

After the election, the composition of the council was:

Election result

Ward results

* - Retiring Councillor seeking re-election

Abercromby

Castle Street

Everton

Exchange

Great George

Lime Street

North Toxteth

Pitt Street

Rodney Street

St. Anne Street

St. Paul's

St. Peter's

Scotland

South Toxteth

Vauxhall

West Derby

By-elections

References

1846
1846 English local elections
November 1846 events
1840s in Liverpool